Erlichmanite is the naturally occurring mineral form of osmium sulfide (OsS2).  It is grey with a metallic luster, hardness around 5, and specific gravity about 9. It is found in noble metal placer deposits.  Named for Jozef Erlichman, electron microprobe analyst at the NASA Ames Research Center.

References 

Sulfide minerals